Jwala Kumari Sah is a Nepalese politician, belonging to the CPN (UML) currently serving as the member of the 2nd Federal Parliament of Nepal. In the 2022 Nepalese general election, she won the election from Bara 3 (constituency).

Sah is also a former member of the Constituent Assembly from the Madhesh Province Provincial Assembly (2074 BS). She has served as the State Minister of Land Reform in 2067 BS and Minister of Tourism in 2068 BS. In Oli's cabinet, she also served as the agriculture minister for 13 days.

In 2022, she became a Minister in Third Dahal cabinet.

References

Living people
Nepal MPs 2022–present
Members of the Provincial Assembly of Madhesh Province
Members of the 1st Nepalese Constituent Assembly
1981 births